Dubowitz is a surname. Notable people with it include:

 Lilly Dubowitz (1930–2016), Hungarian-born British paediatrician
 Mark Dubowitz (born 1968), executive director of the Foundation for Defense of Democracies
 Victor Dubowitz (born 1931), English neurologist

See also
 Dubowitz Score, a method for estimating the gestational age of babies
 Dubowitz syndrome, a rare genetic disorder